Remda-Teichel is a town and a former municipality in the district of Saalfeld-Rudolstadt, in Thuringia, Germany. It is situated 15 km northwest of Saalfeld, and 28 km southeast of Erfurt. Since 1 January 2019, it is part of the town Rudolstadt.

References

Towns in Thuringia
Saalfeld-Rudolstadt
Former municipalities in Thuringia